The 1st Saturn Awards were awarded to media properties and personalities deemed by the Academy of Science Fiction, Fantasy and Horror Films to be the best in science fiction, fantasy and horror released in the year 1972. However, only science fiction and horror were awarded this year, while fantasy would be awarded the following ceremony onward. The inaugural ceremony took place on May 18, 1973.

Below is a complete list of the winners. They are highlighted in bold.

Winners

Best Science Fiction Film
 Slaughterhouse-Five

Best Horror Film
 Blacula

External links
 Official website
 1st Saturn Awards at IMDb

Saturn
01